According to van der Waals, the theorem of corresponding states (or principle/law of corresponding states) indicates that all fluids, when compared at the same reduced temperature and reduced pressure, have approximately the same compressibility factor and all deviate from ideal gas behavior to about the same degree.

Material constants that vary for each type of material are eliminated, in a recast reduced form of a constitutive equation. The reduced variables are defined in terms of critical variables.

The principle originated with the work of Johannes Diderik van der Waals in about 1873 when he used the critical temperature and critical pressure to derive a universal property of all fluids that follow the van der Waals equation of state. It predicts a value of  that is found to be an overestimate when compared to real gases.

Compressibility factor at the critical point

The table below for a selection of gases uses the following conventions:
 : critical temperature [K]
 : critical pressure [Pa]
 : critical specific volume [m3⋅kg−1]
 : gas constant (8.314 J⋅K−1⋅mol−1)
 : Molar mass [kg⋅mol−1]

See also
Van der Waals equation
Equation of state
Compressibility factors
Johannes Diderik van der Waals equation
Noro-Frenkel law of corresponding states

References

External links
 Properties of Natural Gases. Includes a chart of compressibility factors versus reduced pressure and reduced temperature (on last page of the PDF document)
Theorem of corresponding states on SklogWiki.

Laws of thermodynamics
Engineering thermodynamics
Continuum mechanics
Johannes Diderik van der Waals